Paradox is a soundtrack album by Neil Young and Promise of the Real released on 3, 2018 on Shakey Pictures Inc. The album serves as the soundtrack to Daryl Hannah's 2018 film, Paradox, in which Young also stars. It is the third studio album recorded by Young and Promise of the Real.

Background and recording
The instrumental passages on the soundtrack, entitled the "Paradox Passages", were recorded in the studio by Young and Promise of the Real without re-watching any of the film's footage: "We'd seen it, so we just remembered it. There are similarities [with Dead Man], but I like to do that. It's an easy way for me to express a soundtrack: I have the same thing in The LinkVolt Years."

The tracks "Show Me" and "Peace Trail" were previously recorded in a different form for Young's 2016 solo album, Peace Trail. The full-band recording of "Peace Trail", included on Paradox, was the first time Young and Promise of the Real had performed the song together. The live version of "Pocahontas" is from a 2014 performance. Also, the song "Tumbleweed" is a re-recorded version from his 2014 album Storytone, and the song "Hey" contains a guitar riff from the song "Love and Only Love" from Neil’s album with Crazy Horse Ragged Glory.

Band member Lukas Nelson performs a cover of "Angel Flying Too Close to the Ground" by his father, Willie Nelson. Regarding capturing this performance for the film, director Daryl Hannah noted, "It's effortless magic that always happens between them. It's a real gift to witness the creative freedom they have around each other."

Reception

In a mostly positive review for Pitchfork, Stephen Thomas Erlewine wrote: "Drifting between spooky guitar solos, sweet strums, and half-remembered choruses, this soundtrack occasionally stops for a full-fledged song, but these complete moments feel accidental, as if the fog lifts just long enough to reveal a full landscape." Uncut's Michael Bonner wrote: "In many respects, the ramshackle, campfire vibe of the soundtrack mirrors Hannah’s film itself – but, critically, it is neither a fully immersive experience like the Dead Man soundtrack or a third album with Promise of the Real. It’s perhaps best not to view Paradox (either film or soundtrack) as a major work from a significant artist, but yet another of Young’s shaggy digressions."

Track listing

Charts

References

2018 soundtrack albums
Neil Young soundtracks
Lukas Nelson & Promise of the Real albums
Self-released albums
Experimental rock soundtracks
Experimental rock albums by Canadian artists
Experimental rock albums by American artists